Charlie Conord  (born ) is a French male track cyclist, representing France at international competitions. He competed in sprint events at the 2010, 2012 and 2013 UCI Track Cycling World Championships. He won the bronze medal at the 2016 UEC European Track Championships in the keirin event.

References

External links
 Profile at cyclingarchives.com

1990 births
Living people
French male cyclists
French track cyclists
Sportspeople from Haute-Savoie
Cyclists from Auvergne-Rhône-Alpes